Malgora is a peak in Vologda Oblast, Russia. It is the highest point in the region.

Etymology
Despite being a major summit of the Vepsian Upland, the name of the mountain is not of Vepsian origin, but is likely derived from the Karelian word "malja" ("bowl").

Description
The mountain rises in the northwestern sector of the Vytegorsky District and is the highest point of the Vepsian Hills.

The summit is of difficult access, its slopes being covered with dense coniferous forest. There is a geodetic marker at the top.

See also
 List of highest points of Russian federal subjects
 List of mountains and hills of Russia

References

External links
Veps Hills, Makarevskaya, Russia - tourist attractions

Malgora
Landforms of Vologda Oblast